Barbara Donahue Webster is an American botanist and Professor Emerita at the University of California, Davis. She is a past president of the Botanical Society of America, of which she also served as first female treasurer, and a fellow of both the American Association for the Advancement of Science and the American Society for Horticultural Science. She has served as editor of the journal Madroño.

In 2008 she was awarded the Distinguished Fellow of the Botanical Society of America, the society's highest honor.

References

American horticulturists
Year of birth missing (living people)
Place of birth missing (living people)
Living people
American women botanists
Fellows of the American Association for the Advancement of Science
University of California, Davis faculty
Botanical Society of America
20th-century American botanists
21st-century American botanists
20th-century American women scientists
21st-century American women scientists